Josy is a given name. Notable people with the name include:

Josy Ajiboye, Nigerian artist and cartoonist who worked at the Daily Times
Josy Barthel (1927–1992), Luxembourgish athlete
Josy Braun (1938–2012), Luxembourg writer, journalist and translator who wrote mainly in Luxembourgish
Josy Dubié, Belgian reporter, politician and a member of Ecolo
Josy Eisenberg (1933–2017), French television producer and rabbi
Josy Gyr-Steiner (1949–2007), Swiss politician from the Canton of Schwyz, member of the Swiss National Council
Josy Joseph, Indian investigative journalist and author
Josy Koelsch (1926–1985), French sprint canoeist who competed in the early 1950s
Josy Moinet (1929–2018), French politician who served as a Senator for Charente-Maritime
Josy Poueyto, French politician representing the Democratic Movement
Josy Staudt (1904–1937), Luxembourgian gymnast
Josy Stoffel (1928–2021), Luxembourgish gymnast

See also
Lycée Technique Josy Barthel (English: Josy Barthel High School), a high school in Mamer, in south-western Luxembourg
Stade Josy Barthel, the former national stadium of Luxembourg and the former home of the Luxembourg national football team